Endemic goiter is a type of goitre that is associated with dietary iodine deficiency.

Cause
Some inland areas where soil and water lacks in iodine compounds and consumption of marine foods is low are known for higher incidence of goitre. In such areas goitre is said to be "endemic".

Prevention
This type of goiter is easily preventable. In most developed countries regulations have been put into force by health policy institutions requiring salt, flour or water to be fortified with iodine.

Treatment

Treatment of endemic goiter is medical with iodine and thyroxine preparations. Surgery is only necessary in cases where complicated by significant compression of nearby structures.

References

External links 

Mineral deficiencies
Iodine
Endocrine diseases